Chen Genkai (yale: Chan4 Gan1 Gaai1; born December 1950 in Zhongshan, Guangdong) is the current Party Secretary and Chairman of the Standing Committee of Zhongshan People's Congress. Chen is also known to be the mayor of Zhongshan from 1998 to 2006.

Profile
He began working in 1970 and then joined the Communist Party of China.

Served as Vice Mayor of Zhongshan Municipal People's Government, February 1994 - May 1996.
Served as Senior Member and Secretary-General of CPC Zhongshan Committee, November 1995 - February 1998.
Served as Vice Party Secretary of the CPC Zhongshan Committee and Mayor of Zhongshan, February 1998 - December 2006.
Serving as Party Secretary and Chairman of the CPC Zhongshan Committee, since December 2006.

References

1950 births
Living people
Politicians from Zhongshan
Regional leaders in the People's Republic of China
People's Republic of China politicians from Guangdong
Mayors of places in China
Chinese Communist Party politicians from Guangdong
Political office-holders in Guangdong